The 2001 Swedish Touring Car Championship season was the 6th Swedish Touring Car Championship (STCC) season. In total, ten racing weekends at six different circuits were held; each round comprising two races, making up a twenty-round competition in total.

Teams and drivers
S = Synsam Cup (Privateer Cup)

Race calendar and winners

Championship results

Independent's championship

Manufacturer's Championship

References

External links
STCC homepage

Swedish Touring Car Championship seasons
Swedish Touring Car Championship
Swedish Touring Car Championship season